Pranati Rai Prakash is an actor and Indian fashion model best known as the winner of India's Next Top Model 2016 edition. She was also a semi-finalist at Miss India 2015. She has featured in web series, her titular show being Mannphodganj Ki Binny, in several TV commercials and walked for Lakmé Fashion Week and India International Bridal Week.

Early life
Pranati was born to Colonel Prem Prakash and Sadhana Rai. She was born in Dehradun and she hails from Patna in Bihar. Due to her father's job in the army, her family relocated to a number of places in India, including Srinagar, Port Blair, Bathinda, Mhow, Delhi, Thiruvananthapuram, Shillong, Delhi, Dehradun and Patna.  She studied fashion communication from NIFT, Mumbai. She is currently based in Mumbai.

Modelling career
She has received a lot of recognition because of her stint in the Miss India pageant of 2015 and was a major front runner there. Pranati won the titles of Miss Talented, Miss Fashion Icon and Miss Beautiful Legs at Femina Miss India and was 1st runner up in Miss Sudoku, Top 5 in National Costume round and Top 5 of Miss Body Beautiful. Pranati is the Winner of India's Next Top Model Season 2. During episode 3, makeovers occurred. Prakash's long black hair was cut as an auburn lob with bangs.

Acting career

Films

Television

Web series

References

External links 

 
 

Living people
Next Top Model winners
Female models from Bihar
People from Patna
1994 births
People from Dehradun